A tiltrotator (known under a number of trade names) is a hydraulic attachment/tool used on most excavators, and backhoes between 1,5 and 40 tons in the Nordic countries (Sweden, Finland, and Norway). A tiltrotator is mounted on the excavator such that the excavator bucket can be rotated through 360 degrees and one tilts +/- 45 degrees, in order to increase the flexibility and precision of the excavator. The Tiltrotator (also known as a Rototilt) was introduced to the market in Sweden in the early 1980s by the Norgrens under the family owned and operated company named Noreco, and has become the standard in Scandinavia. The concept has recently gained popularity in other countries such as the Netherlands, Germany, UK, Japan, Canada and United States.

Description 
A tiltrotator can best be described as a wrist between the arm of the excavator and bucket, (or whatever other tool is fitted to the tiltrotator's quick coupler).  With its integral quick coupler and rotary swivel, the tiltrotator can also use extra hydraulic functions to power and manipulate other worktools below it such as a breaker, grapple or an auger,  which can be attached to the quickcoupler on the tiltrotator, for simplified attachment mounting, dramatically increasing the excavator's utilization on the jobsite. Control systems which allows the operator to operate the machine fully through the joysticks. Recognized control systems are SVAB, ICS by Rototilt, Engcon Microprop DC2 and Steelwrist XControl G2. The tiltrotator is nowadays controlled through machines two or four electro-proportionally controlled hydraulic lines.

Manufacturers 
There are three major manufacturers of the Tiltrotator concept today (although similar products are sold by various competitors):
 Rototilt Group AB (founded in 1973 by Allan Jonsson) who purchased Noreco in 1992, hired the Norgren brothers, and registered the brandname Rototilt. 
 Engcon (founded in 1993 by also ex-Noreco employee, Stig Engstrom) who started manufacturing their own product using only "tiltrotator" to avoid trademark infringements.
 Steelwrist (founded in 2005 by a team of industrialists), who started manufacturing after acquiring a new design originating from a tiltrotator called Dento which was released in 1989.

Other companies manufacturing their version of tiltrotator on a smaller scale include Juhyun (주현), JK attachment (S.Korea), SMP, HKS, Kinshofer, Catsu, Giant China and Marttiini Metal under various product names as tiltrotator, swingrotator, swingotilt, MRT, Nox, Rotiltor etc., although it's still commonplace on the market as a genericized trademark to call all versions a Tiltrotator.

World strongest tiltrotator MRT42 is made by MRT Marttiini Rotation & Tilt in 2021.

References

External links
http://www.jkattach.co.kr
http://www.steelwrist.com
https://www.hks-partner.com/tiltrotator
https://www.marttiinimetal.fi/en/index.php
http://www.engcon.com
http://www.rototilt.com
http://www.smpparts.com
http://www.maskinnet.se/maskinnet/kategori/utrustning.php?kid=1&aid=69
http://www.kinshofer.com/eng/index.php/en/excavator-applications-4/construction-landscaping-snow-removal/nox-tiltrotators-control-systems
http://www.everymachinery.com/em-catsu/product-1520
http://www.giantchina.com/english/product/det_gdpsj.jsp
http://en.jhtr.co.kr/

Construction equipment
Swedish inventions
Science and technology in Sweden